Paragrilus tenuis is a species of metallic wood-boring beetle in the family Buprestidae. It is found in North America. Larvae are associated with plants in the genus Hibiscus.

References

Further reading

 
 
 

Buprestidae
Articles created by Qbugbot
Beetles described in 1863